Victoria Newman is a fictional character from The Young and the Restless, an American soap opera on the CBS network. Created by William J. Bell, she is currently portrayed by Amelia Heinle. Victoria was born onscreen in 1982 and was portrayed by child actress Ashley Nicole Millan for her first eight years. Having been rapidly aged to a teenager, Victoria returned to the soap opera and was portrayed by Heather Tom. Tom portrayed the character into her early adult years and remained in the role for thirteen years. Due to creative differences, Tom left the soap opera in 2003 and Heinle, who debuted as Victoria on March 21, 2005, was cast in the role.

The daughter of businessman Victor Newman (Eric Braeden), Victoria was described as "the teenager from hell" during her early years, and as an adult she was written as a ruthless character. Her storylines have involved romances with older men, family conflicts, and difficult pregnancies. Victoria is the third member of the Newman family to appear in the program and was joined later by her younger siblings. Her early romances included long-standing relationships with Ryan McNeil (Scott Reeves) and Cole Howard (J. Eddie Peck). Upon her second return to the show she had relationships with J.T. Hellstrom (Thad Luckinbill) and Billy Abbott (Jason Thompson). Victoria has three children: Reed Hellstrom (Tristan Lake Leabu) by J.T., Johnny Abbott, Billy's son whom she adopted as her own, and Katie Newman.

Tom won the Daytime Emmy Award for Outstanding Younger Actress in a Drama Series twice for her portrayal of Victoria, and received nominations for eight other Emmy awards. Critics praised Tom's portrayal of the character, though her marriages at an early age were criticized. Heinle's portrayal later won her the Daytime Emmy Award for Outstanding Supporting Actress in a Drama Series in 2014 and 2015.

Casting 
Between 1982 and 1990, Victoria was portrayed by child actress Ashley Nicole Millan. After Millan left the series, Victoria was rapidly aged to become a teenager, and Heather Tom assumed the role on December 12, 1990. In 1997, Tom took a nearly eight-month leave of absence from the role, departing on February 21 and returning on October 2. During Tom's absence, Sarah Aldrich was cast as her temporary replacement, appearing from April 2 to July 17, 1997.

In 1999, Carrie Genzel was in talks to replace Tom, who was experiencing "touch-and-go" contract negotiations. However, Tom signed another three-year deal with the soap opera and said she was "very excited" about her continuation. In September 2003, Tom's spokesman announced that she would leave the show because of "creative differences" with executive producer David Shaughnessy. Speaking of her departure, Shaughnessy said that it was "tough" to see her go and that "they would miss her tremendously". Tom made her final appearance as Victoria on December 17, 2003, and she later said that she left the role because "things weren't going in her best interests".

The soap opera's producers intended Victoria to return in January 2004 but auditions failed to find a suitable replacement for Tom. Amelia Heinle was later cast in the role and made her first appearance on March 21, 2005. Rachel Kimsey also auditioned for the role and Heinle had auditioned for Mackenzie Browning; Kimsey was given Mackenzie and Heinle was given Victoria. Heinle has stated on many occasions that she had "serious doubts" about taking over Tom's role. In 2013, she recalled on what intimidated her about Tom, saying: "Heather is pure backbone, and that's probably what intimidated me about following in her footsteps because that's not me naturally." In 2008, she took maternity leave and was off-screen for weeks. In March 2011, Heinle announced that she had signed a new contract which would secure her in the role for an unspecified period. In November 2013, it was announced that Heinle had signed another contract to continue her portrayal of Victoria for an additional two years.

Development

Characterization and portrayal

According to SoapNet, Victoria is "ruthless in the board room" and "nobody's damsel in distress". The soap opera's official website describes the character as having "displayed both her father's headstrong qualities and her mother's tendency to be impulsive". While the character was a teenager, Kelly O'Sullivan of the New York Daily News called her "the teen from hell". Heather Tom said that Victoria had Victor's strength and the manipulative skills of her former-alcoholic mother Nikki. Of the character's determination, Tom said that "Victoria knows disappointment, yet she gets her way most of the time" and "she goes after what she wants, and wins". During Victoria's divorce from Cole Howard (J. Eddie Peck), The Orlando Sentinel said that Victoria's behavior was "pig-faced".

Relationships
Victoria has her first romance with Ryan McNeil, which ends when he leaves her for Nina Webster (Tricia Cast). The series' creator William J. Bell said that Victoria knew Nina still loved Ryan and suspected that the marriage would not last, and that "in Victoria's mind, the threat is still there". She is then married to Cole Howard for four years but they begin to have marital problems after Cole's affair with Ashley Abbott (Shari Shattuck). Tom said that being married on a soap opera is "short lived" and that she knew Cole and Victoria would eventually face difficulties, which she found challenging to act. While pregnant with Cole's child, Victoria has a relationship with Neil Winters (Kristoff St. John) and plans to raise the child with him, but her daughter Eve Howard dies shortly after birth and she and Neil separate. After being raped by an insane man, Victoria reunites with Ryan and they plan to marry before he is shot dead by his ex-wife, Tricia Dennison (Sabryn Genet). Victoria also has brief relationships with Diego Guittierez (Greg Vaughan) and Michael Baldwin (Christian LeBlanc).

A decade after her marriage to Cole, Victoria marries Brad Carlton (Don Diamont); their marriage ends after Brad has an affair. She then becomes pregnant with J.T. Hellstrom's (Thad Luckinbill) child and during her pregnancy becomes comatose. Heinle believed Victoria and J.T. would "stay together for a while before they wreck it". After it was announced that Luckinbill was leaving the soap opera, Victoria and J.T. drift apart and eventually divorce. Victoria next begins a relationship with Billy Abbott that their feuding families are against; Heinle described Billy as "the forbidden fruit" and compared their romance to Romeo and Juliet. They later marry in a 1950s-styled screen wedding; her wedding dress was inspired by a gown worn by Audrey Hepburn in the film Funny Face. Actress Elinor Donahue was cast to portray the judge that officiates their wedding, as former co-head writer Scott Hamner felt that Donahue could help them achieve the sense of a "retro-fantasy of better, simpler times". After their wedding, Billy illegally purchases a baby girl for Victoria. Heinle felt this plot was a good way to add conflict drama to the soap opera. The couple lose custody of the child, Billy leaves Genoa City and Victoria divorces him, but her father hides Billy from his family. The pair are later reunited in a New York airport bar. Hamner noted that Victoria would be "absolutely furious" at her father for what he had done: "[There is a] potential for a huge rift between father and daughter, and there will be some consequences for Victor with his relationship with Victoria in light of all that he's done to keep her apart from the man she loves." He also stated that the "impact of those secrets coming to light was going to be very serious in Billy and Victoria's ability to move forward together".

Storylines
In 1990, eight-year-old Victoria becomes upset that her mother Nikki Newman (Melody Thomas Scott) has married Jack Abbott (Peter Bergman), even after he saves her from drowning in a swimming pool. When she continues to misbehave, her parents send her to boarding school in Switzerland. Later that year, Victoria returns as a moody teenager who is working in the mailroom at her father's company, Newman Enterprises, and becoming smitten with Ryan McNeil (Scott Reeves), who is older than her. Victor offers Ryan money to leave town but he and Victoria elope. Their marriage ends when Ryan leaves her for Nina Webster (Tricia Cast) in 1993. Victoria then falls in love with Cole Howard (J. Eddie Peck) and they marry the following year, but their marriage is quickly annulled when it is believed by their parents that they are half-siblings, as Victor is believed to be Cole's father. When this is proved untrue they wed again; this marriage breaks down four years later when in 1998 Cole has sex with Ashley Abbott (Shari Shattuck/Eileen Davidson), her former stepmother. Victoria becomes pregnant with Cole's child and chooses to raise it with Neil Winters (Kristoff St. John). Her baby girl, Eve Howard, dies a few days after birth and Victoria ends her union with Neil. Victoria briefly tries and fails to win Cole back from Ashley. In 1999, Victoria meets Gary Dawson (Ricky Paull Goldin) and they begin dating, though she soon discovers that he is stalking her and ends the relationship. Enraged, Gary kidnaps Victoria in a tree house and she is raped. She takes months to recover. She and Ryan then reunite and plan to remarry, but on their wedding day in November 2001 Ryan's ex-wife Tricia Dennison shoots and kills him, leaving Victoria devastated. She then has a brief relationship with Diego Guittierez (Diego Serrano/Greg Vaughan) in 2002, and afterward dates Michael Baldwin (Christian LeBlanc). The following year, some of Victor's crimes come to light and Victoria leaves town when these and other family problems overwhelm her. She moves to Florence, Italy, where she studies Art History.

In 2005, Victoria returns to Genoa City after Jack makes her a job offer to run Jabot. She tries to resume her relationship with Michael, only to discover he has married Lauren Fenmore (Tracey E. Bregman). She then begins dating her father's business rival Brad Carlton (Don Diamont) and in 2006 they marry, much to Victor's disapproval. Victoria becomes pregnant with Brad's child but miscarries. Their marriage ends in 2007 when Victoria discovers that Brad had an affair with Sharon Newman (Sharon Case), her former sister in law, before their wedding. During her marriage she forms a friendship with J.T. Hellstrom (Thad Luckinbill) and they have sex twice, resulting in a pregnancy of unknown paternity.  J.T. is revealed as the father, and during her pregnancy Victoria is hit by falling rockscaused by an explosionwhich leaves her comatose. She recovers and gives birth to a son, Reed Hellstrom (Max Page), and she marries J.T. in February 2008. After J.T. kisses his ex-girlfriend Colleen the following year, Victoria has an affair with Deacon Sharpe (Sean Kanan), complicating their marriage, which ends in 2010 after J.T. becomes intimate with Mackenzie Browning (Clementine Ford).

Victoria then begins a secret romance with Billy Abbott. She and Billy marry while intoxicated in Jamaica, but the marriage is declared invalid and they remarry. During the ceremony, Victor has Victoria arrested in an attempt to stop the wedding. J.T. gains full custody of Reed and moves to Washington, DC with his new wife Mackenzie for her job. Victoria and her siblings pursue a lawsuit against Victor to gain control of a cosmetics line. After Victoria miscarries a child with Billy, he illegally pays $2,000,000 for a child, whom they name Lucy in January 2011. Phyllis Summers (Michelle Stafford) gains custody of Lucy and Billy leaves town without disclosing his whereabouts to his wife. Victoria later pursues divorce proceedings in Billy's long absence. After their divorce, Victoria and Billy's mother, Jill Fenmore, try unsuccessfully to locate Billy whose daughter, Delia Abbott has Leukemia and needs a bone marrow transplant. The pair find each other in a New York airport bar, reunite, and remarry in December 2011. As they return home from their honeymoon, Chelsea Lawson (Melissa Claire Egan) arrives, announcing she is pregnant with Billy's child. Chelsea barters with Billy demanding 3 million dollars. She later gives birth to a boy, Johnny, but gives Billy full custody of their son. Victoria decides to stay in her marriage to Billy and help him raise the child. Later, Victoria returns to Newman Enterprises to try and save it from Sharon's destruction. While on business in Miami in November 2012, she is kidnapped by Eddie G. (Blake Gibbons), who demands that Billy repay a gambling debt as a ransom. Eddie is shot and killed in front of her, and she is finally rescued by her brother Nick, and recovers. Billy later relapses in his gambling addiction, and the couple briefly separate. However, Victoria again decides to reconcile with Billy and continue their marriage. In October 2013, Billy's daughter Delia is struck and killed by Adam in a hit and run accident. Billy embarks on an affair with a woman in his grief support group, Kelly Andrews (Cady McClain). Meanwhile, Victoria grows close with Stitch Rayburn (Sean Carrigan). Victoria files for legal separation after Billy's affair is exposed, and she ends up sleeping with Stitch. Victoria then finds out she is pregnant but is unsure of the child's paternity. The child, named Katherine Rose after Victoria's late godmother Katherine Chancellor (Jeanne Cooper), later turned out to be Billy's, but Victoria decides to continue her relationship with Stitch regardless. However, Victoria and Stitch's relationship comes to an end soon thereafter when Stitch develops feelings for Victoria's half-sister, Abby (Melissa Ordway). Victoria and Billy end up reuniting again, much to Victor's chagrin.

Reception 

Connie Passalacqua of the Herald Journal compared Victoria's scheme to reunite her parents in 1991 to the plot of the 1961 film The Parent Trap. She wrote, "[w]hat makes Victoria a true terror teen? We venture that it may be the supernatural soap aging by which she aged from 5 to 15 last fall." Fort Worth Star-Telegram criticized Victoria's early romances, saying: "[s]he's divorced, rich and hates sex. And now she wants her husband back. As soap operas go, Victoria Newman's plight ... is standard daytime fare. But Victoria has one characteristic that many of her counterparts don't—she is only 17." A syndicated article that appeared in The Fort Oglethorpe Press described Ryan McNeil's attempts to seduce Victoria as "a path that's fraught with peril and which forces the good-natured actor to search hard for inspiration". SoapNet said it was "no surprise" Victoria has a history of "messy relationships" given her parents' history. Lilana Novakovich of the Toronto Star said that Heather Tom made Victoria become "one of her favorite characters" on the soap upon her debut in 1991. The Austin American-Statesman said that Tom was "always a pleasure to watch".

Dan J. Kroll of the website SoapCentral wrote that the process to find a replacement for Tom was an "exhaustive search". Amelia Heinle, who critics praised for her portrayal of Victoria, has been listed on the "Top 5 Actresses" poll of CBS Soaps in Depth for over eight consecutive weeks. Her relationship with Billy has garnered a significant fan following, allowing them to lead CBS Soaps in Depths "Top 10 Couples" poll for over six consecutive weeks. Elinor Donahue, who portrayed the judge that marries Victoria and Billy, said she thought their "retro wedding" was "adorable" and "extremely well written and not overdone". Zap2it placed Victoria and Billy at number four of their "10 Best Soap Couples of 2011". Jamey Giddens of Zap2it said Victoria and Billy are "so scrumptious together", and that "it's so nice to have some reason to say something kind about The Young and the Restless for a change". Giddens also said that he "adores this pairing that he was so prepared to hate". Sara Bibel of Xfinity wrote of their relationship: "Billy (Billy Miller) and Victoria (Amelia Heinle), who have already had three weddings in the year and a half that they have been together, actually seem rational. They should change the wedding vows in the G.C. from "until death to us part," to "until one of us changes our mind." However, Bibel was later unfavorable of the couple attempting to have a child less than six months after marrying.

In 2011, during a storyline that saw Victoria and her siblings sue their father for control of a cosmetics line, Bibel wrote: "Victoria, whose true motivation was to get her hands on Beauty of Nature so she could become its CEO, got a rude awakening when Nick told her in no uncertain terms that he had no interest in trading the settlement money for the company. I think the second stage of the battle will be the Newman siblings squabbling over the money a la King Lear, assuming the show actually allows Victor to lose for more than a few episodes." Soon after, Bibel said that Victoria had been "whiny" and found the character's mother Nikki's storyline "far more interesting". That same year, Giddens wrote that a blogger from The Washington Post compared Victoria to Rupert Murdoch, saying: "[a] partial nod must go to the soap opera The Young and the Restless, whose character Victoria Newman was arrested on her wedding day for allegedly bribing a foreign dignitary. Television and Murdoch and ’round-the-clock FCPA conjectureit's a welcome publicity storm for the FCPA bar."

In 2013, Bibel criticized the soap opera when Victoria "decided to give up a corporate career to become a children’s book author", writing: "From the time she was SORASED into a teen, Victoria’s ambition was to run Newman Enterprises. She was the child who inherited Victor’s (Eric Braeden) business acumen. He, being a male chauvinist, always viewed the more family oriented Nick as his heir apparent. Her struggle to get her father’s recognition is what fueled her." She also stated that while watching the series, there was "the sense that women could, if that was what interested them, be power players". Of Victoria's choice to leave Newman Enterprises, Bibel wrote: "For Victoria, it came across as giving up Peggy Olsen’s life for Betty Draper’s. I was also peeved by her telling her mother that she didn't have the first idea of how to become an author. She ran a major cosmetics company. She should have a hundred contacts in publishing, and the confidence and skills to figure out what she doesn't know. I got to thinking about all of the ways that, over the past few months, the women of Genoa City have been, to use the lingo of Leaning In, the most popular non-fiction book in the country right now, leaning out." Tommy Garrett of Highlight Hollywood blamed head writer Josh Griffith for turning the character into a "hard-nosed unforgiving socialite".

Heather Tom won two Daytime Emmy Award for Outstanding Younger Actress in a Drama Series for her portrayal of Victoria in 1993 and 1999, and received eight other nominations for the same award. She also won a Soap Opera Digest Award for Outstanding Leading Younger Actress in 1997, and was nominated for two other awards.

References and notes 

Female characters in television
Fictional artists
Fictional business executives
Fictional female businesspeople
Fictional schoolteachers
Fictional socialites
Television characters introduced in 1982
The Young and the Restless characters